Natasha de Troyer (born 8 August 1978 Ghent) is a visually impaired Belgian alpine skier. She represented Belgium in Paralympic Alpine skiing at the 2006 Paralympic Winter Games, 2010 Paralympic Winter Games, and the World Championships, where she won one silver and two bronze medals.

Career 
In the 2009 IPC Alpine Skiing World Championships in Pyeongchang, Natasha de Troyer and her guide Diego Van de Voorde finished 3rd in the super-combined.  In 1st place the Slovak athlete Henrieta Farkašová and her guide Natalia Subrtova, followed by the Canadian Viviane Forest and her guide Lindsay Debou. 

She competed at the 2006 Winter Paralympics, finishing fourth in the Women's slalom, fifth in Women's giant slalom, fifth in Women's Super-G, and fifth in Women's downhill. 

Natasha de Troyer was the only athlete to represent her country at the 2010 Winter Paralympic Games, in Vancouver, competing in all five alpine skiing events. Just four months before the Vancouver Games, she suffered a knee injury.  She finished seventh in Women's slalom, eighth in Women's downhill, fifth in Women's combined, fifth in Women's Super-G, and did not finish the Women's giant slalom.

She was among the 130 athletes from 27 countries to participate in the 2011 IPC Alpine Skiing World Championships in Sestriere. She finished fifth in Giant slalom, fifth in Slalom, fifth in Super combined, fifth in Super-G,

References

External links 

 Official website

1978 births
Paralympic alpine skiers
Living people